Plumrose USA, Inc. produces sliced meats, deli hams, and bacon in the United States. The company offers its products to food distributors, retailers, warehouse stores, institutions, and restaurants. What started out as a sliced ham company in 1932, has expanded into a business that offers a multitude of product lines including premium bacons, packaged deli meats, quality deli counter hams, cooked ribs and canned hams.

Background
The company was founded in 1932 and is headquartered in Chicago, Illinois, with production facilities in Booneville, Mississippi, Elkhart, Indiana, Swanton, Vermont and two facilities in Council Bluffs, Iowa; distribution facilities in Tupelo, Mississippi and South Bend, Indiana and offices in East Brunswick, New Jersey and Rogers, Arkansas. Plumrose USA, Inc. operated as a subsidiary of Danish Crown Group. until May 1, 2017.

In March 2017, Brazil's JBS agreed to acquire the company for $230 million subject to regulatory approval.  The deal closed on May 1, 2017.

References

External links

Brand name meats
Companies based in Middlesex County, New Jersey
Food and drink companies established in 1932
East Brunswick, New Jersey
Food manufacturers of the United States
1932 establishments in the United States
Meat packers